Vol(l)ume 14 is the fourteenth studio album by the German thrash metal band Tankard, released through AFM Records.

Track listing

Personnel
Andreas "Gerre" Geremia - vocals
Andy Gutjahr - guitar
Frank Thorwarth - bass, backing vocals
Olaf Zissel - drums

References

2010 albums
Tankard (band) albums
AFM Records albums